The Miami String Quartet is an American string quartet.  The group was founded in 1988 at The New World School of the Arts by John de Lancie in Miami, Florida.  The Quartet was in Residence at Kent State University in Kent, Ohio, where all four members served as faculty members in the School of Music, and two still remain.  The Quartet was the Grand Prize winner at the Fischoff competition, First Prize winners of the Concert Artists Guild competition, and prize winners at the London and Evian International Quartet Competitions.  They were awarded the Cleveland Quartet Award and were named to the Chamber Music Society of Lincoln Center II Residency as well.  The Miami Quartet has served as Artists in Residence at the Hartt School and Florida International University and perform and teach at the Kent Blossom Music Festival every summer.

Recordings
The Miami String Quartet's first recording, which featured the first two string quartets by Alberto Ginastera, was released in 1994. Their second CD, of Camille Saint-Saëns first two string quartets and Gabriel Fauré's String Quartet, was released in 1997. In 1999, they released a CD of the first three string quartets of Pēteris Vasks.

Current members
Benny Kim, violin
Cathy Meng Robinson, violin
Scott Lee, viola
Keith Robinson, cello

External links
Miami String Quartet official site

Musical groups established in 1988
American string quartets
Musical groups from Kent, Ohio